Jeffrey Byrd is the name of:

Jeffrey J. Byrd, American biologist
Jeffrey W. Byrd, American film director, producer and screenwriter
Jeff Byrd (born 1956), American baseball pitcher
Geoff Byrd (born 1970), American musician

See also
Geoffrey Bird (disambiguation)